Australia competed at the 1998 Winter Olympics in Nagano, Japan.
A total number of 24 athletes competed, participating in alpine skiing, biathlon, bobsleigh, cross-country skiing, figure skating, freestyle skiing, short track speed skating, and snowboarding, which appeared for the first time at the Olympics. Freestyle skiers Kirstie Marshall and Jacqui Cooper were some of Australia's best gold medal hopes, but both missed the aerials finals. Zali Steggall won Australia's first individual Winter Olympics medal, gaining bronze in slalom.

Medalists

Alpine skiing

Women

Biathlon

Women

Bobsleigh 

The two-man result was Australia's best in that event.

Cross-country skiing

Men

Figure skating

Joanne Carter's result was Australia's best in women's figure skating.

Freestyle skiing

Men

Women

Short track speed skating

Men

Women

Snowboarding 

Giant slalom

References

External links 
Australia NOC
Olympic Winter Institute of Australia
"2002 Australian Winter Olympic Team Guide" PDF file
"The Compendium: Official Australian Olympic Statistics 1896-2002" Australian Olympic Committee  (Inconsistencies in sources mentioned in Wikibooks:Errata/0702234257)

Nations at the 1998 Winter Olympics
1998
Winter sports in Australia
1998 in Australian sport